The following is a list of FCC-licensed radio stations in the U.S. state of Utah, which can be sorted by their call signs, frequencies, cities of license, licensees, and programming formats.

List of radio stations

Defunct 
 KCVD-LP
 KEMR
 KEPH
 KGVU
 KHUN
 KLGU-LP
 KLLB
 KNFL
 KOBY
 KSOS
 KTKK
 KWDZ
 KXOL

References 

 
Radio stations
Utah